Ian Murphy (born January 16, 2000) is an American professional soccer player who plays as a defender for Major League Soccer club FC Cincinnati.

Career

Youth 
Murphy played club soccer as part of the FC Golden State academy, helping the team to the finals of the Dallas Cup in 2014–15, and a first-place finish in the Southwest Division of the Western Conference in 2016–17.

College 
In 2018, Murphy attended Duke University to play college soccer. During his time at Duke, Murphy made 69 appearances for the Blue Devils, scoring three goals and tallying seven assists. He was named to the ACC Academic Honor Roll on three consecutive occasions, was Duke's Defender of the Year in 2021, and was Third Team All-South Region in his senior season.

Professional
On January 11, 2022, Murphy was selected 14th overall in the 2022 MLS SuperDraft by FC Cincinnati. He officially signed with the Major League Soccer club on February 23, 2022. He made his professional debut on March 5, 2022, appearing as a 75th-minute substitute during a 0–1 loss to D.C. United.

References

External links 
 Ian Murphy at FC Cincinnati
 Ian Murphy at Duke

Living people
2000 births
American soccer players
Association football defenders
Duke Blue Devils men's soccer players
FC Cincinnati draft picks
FC Cincinnati players
FC Cincinnati 2 players
MLS Next Pro players
Major League Soccer players
People from Redlands, California
Soccer players from California
United States men's youth international soccer players